Marilyn Gladu  (née McInerney; born 1962) is a Canadian politician who has been the Conservative Member of Parliament for Sarnia—Lambton since 2015. She was elected to the House of Commons in the 2015 Canadian federal election and served in Andrew Scheer's Official Opposition in the 42nd Parliament of Canada.

Career 
Gladu was a professional engineer who worked for Dow Chemical for 21 years, in a variety of roles locally and globally. She then became engineering manager and subsequently the director of engineering at Suncor before taking a consultant role at WorleyParsons. During her career, Gladu was the chair for the Canadian Society of Chemical Engineers locally, and the national director of science and industrial policy for the same organization. She has been on the dean's advisory council for the Faculty of Engineering at Queen's University.

In 2016, she sponsored a private member's bill (C-277), "An Act providing for the development of a framework on palliative care in Canada" which became law in December 2017.

Gladu was named a Fellow of the Canadian Academy of Engineers and a Fellow of Engineers Canada in 2017.

She currently serves as the Official Opposition's critic for civil liberties. She previously served as critic for health and as chair of the Standing Committee on the Status of Women. Under the previous leadership of Rona Ambrose, Gladu was the Official Opposition critic for science.

In the October 2019 election, she was elected for a second term for the Sarnia—Lambton riding. In January 2020, she declared her intention to run in the 2020 Conservative Party of Canada leadership election. She was disqualified by the Conservative party on March 25, 2020.

In April 2020, Gladu sparked controversy in an interview with Melanie Irwin of Blackburn Radio by promoting a controversial and unproven treatment for COVID-19. At that time, Gladu referred to the treatment of “hydroxychloroquine, with azithromycin and zinc sulphate” as having a “nearly 100 per cent recovery rate”. Gladu responded to the reports claiming that her "comments were taken out of context and do not accurately represent the full plan needed." Sarnia Mayor Mike Bradley called Gladu's comments "surprising, disappointing and not reflective of what medical experts in Canada and the United States have been saying.".

In June 2021, Gladu publicly opposed and voted against Bill C-6, an act that would end the practice of conversion therapy in Canada. The Bill passed in the House of Commons but did not pass through the Senate. Conservatives subsequently brought a unanimous consent motion to pass the amended conversion therapy bill at all stages in 2021.

In 2022, Gladu introduced Bill C-228, the Pension Protection Act to protect pensioners in cases of company bankruptcy. The bill passed unanimously in the House of Commons and is currently before the Senate.

In addition to English, Gladu speaks French.

Awards and recognition 
In 2016, Gladu was honored by Maclean's as the most collegial MP of 2016, "Increasingly known for her pragmatic approach, the rookie MP for Sarnia–Lambton is a loyal Conservative who consistently works across party lines."

Electoral record

References

External links

Year of birth uncertain
1960s births
Living people
Conservative Party of Canada MPs
Members of the House of Commons of Canada from Ontario
Women members of the House of Commons of Canada
Canadian chemical engineers
Canadian women engineers
COVID-19 misinformation
Dow Chemical Company employees
Sunoco LP people
Canadian management consultants
People from Lambton County
Women in Ontario politics
21st-century Canadian politicians
21st-century Canadian women politicians